Graham Edward Budd is a British palaeontologist. He is Professor and head of palaeobiology at Uppsala University.

Budd's research focuses on the Cambrian explosion and on the evolution and development, anatomy, and patterns of diversification of the Ecdysozoa, a group of animals that include arthropods.

Life and work 

Budd was born on 7 September 1968 in Colchester (Essex). He obtained his undergraduate degree at the University of Cambridge and remained there, in the Department of Earth Sciences, to continue his studies at a doctoral level by investigating the Sirius Passet fossil lagerstätte from the Cambrian of North Greenland. He finished his doctorate in 1994, with one of the findings being a new species of lobopodian, Kerygmachela. Budd then moved to Sweden as a postdoc along with his PhD supervisor John Peel.

Together with Sören Jensen he reintroduced the concepts of stem and crown groups to phylogenetics and is a major critic of molecular clocks current usage in determining the origin of animal and plant groups.

He has edited  Acta Zoologica together with Lennart Olsson; he has also edited the Geological Magazine.

Accolates 

 Hodson Fund of the Palaeontological Association in 2002.
 President's Medal of the Palaeontological Association in 2015.
 Nathorst Prize of the Geologiska Foreningen in 2021.

Selected publications 

 G. E. Budd. 2002. A palaeontological solution to the arthropod head problem. Nature 417: 271-275.
 G. E. Budd. 2006. On the origin and evolution of major morphological characters. Biological Reviews 81: 609-628.
 G. E. Budd. 2017. The origin of the animals and a ‘Savannah’ hypothesis for early bilaterian evolution. Biological Reviews 92(1), 446-473

See also 
 Arthropod head problem

References

External links 
Graham Budd's web page at Uppsala University

1968 births
British palaeontologists
English palaeontologists
Swedish paleontologists
Swedish scientists
Living people
Paleobiologists
Alumni of Downing College, Cambridge
Alumni of St John's College, Cambridge